Myles Goodwyn, released in 1988, is the self-titled debut solo album by Myles Goodwyn, lead vocalist of the Canadian rock group April Wine. Two alternate versions of this album exist, with a reissue having been released with different Album cover art from that of the original. Another notable difference found on the reissued version was that "Sonya", track #4 on the original release, was retitled "My Girl". (The song's co-writer Jeff Paris had released the song as "My Girl" two years prior on his debut solo album, Race to Paradise) Tracks 8 and 9 are switched on the reissued version as well.

Singles from this album include "My Girl", and "Do You Know What I Mean" (with background vocals provided by Lee Aaron).

Track listing
All tracks written by Myles Goodwyn unless otherwise noted.

Original release
 "Veil of Tears" – 4:23
 "Do You Know What I Mean" (Lee Michaels) – 3:45
 "Caviar" – 4:34
 "Sonya" (Jeff Paris, Lenna Svajian) – 5:10
 "Head On" (Goodwyn, Downing) – 4:58
 "Face the Storm" – 4:24
 "Frank Sinatra Can't Sing" (Goodwyn, Quinn) – 4:01
 "Givin' It Up for Your Love" – 4:39
 "Are You Still Loving Me" – 4:10
 "Mama Won't Say (It's Good)" (Goodwyn, Quinn) – 4:42

Reissued release
 "Veil of Tears"
 "Do You Know What I Mean" (Michaels)
 "Caviar" 
 "My Girl" (Paris, Svajian)
 "Head On" (Goodwyn, Downing)
 "Face the Storm"
 "Frank Sinatra Can't Sing" (Goodwyn, Quinn)
 "Are You Still Loving Me"
 "Givin' It Up for Your Love"
 "Mama Won't Say (It's Good)" (Goodwyn, Quinn)

Personnel
 Myles Goodwyn – vocals, guitars, keyboards, producer
 Jon Carin – keyboards & synth programming
 Gerry Cohen – keyboards & synth programming
 David Shaw – keyboards & synth programming
 Dave Rosenthal – keyboards & synth programming
 Kitten & The Cat – keyboards & synth programming
 Rob Rizzo – keyboards & synth programming
 Lance Quinn – guitars, producer, keyboards & synth programming
 Joe (Snake) Henchcliff – guitars
 Doug Gordon – guitars
 Jay Davidson – saxophone
 Rick Valente – harmonica
 Andy Newmark – drums (on Caviar)
 Lee Aaron – background vocals
 Ritchie Rubini – background vocals
 Rudy Rubini – background vocals
 Carol Brooks – background vocals
 Jeannie Brooks – background vocals

References

1988 debut albums
Myles Goodwyn albums
Aquarius Records (Canada) albums
Atlantic Records albums
Albums produced by Myles Goodwyn